The Bureau of Indian Standards (BIS) is the National Standards Body of India under Department of Consumer affairs, Ministry of Consumer Affairs, Food & Public Distribution, Government of India. It is established by the Bureau of Indian Standards Act, 2016 which came into effect on 12 October 2017. The Minister in charge of the Ministry or Department having administrative control of the BIS is the ex-officio President of the BIS. BIS has 500 plus scientific officers working as Certification Officers, Member secretaries of technical committees and lab OIC's.

The organisation was formerly the Indian Standards Institution (ISI), set up under the Resolution of the Department of Industries and Supplies No. 1 Std.(4)/45, dated 3 September 1946. The ISI was registered under the Societies Registration Act, 1860.

A new Bureau of Indian standards (BIS) Act 2016 which was notified on 22 March 2016, has been brought into force with effect from 12 October 2017. The Act establishes the Bureau of Indian Standards (BIS) as the National Standards Body of India.

As a National Standards Body, it has 25 members drawn from Central or State Governments, industry, scientific and research institutions, and consumer organisations. Its headquarters are in New Delhi, with regional offices in Eastern Region at Kolkata, southern Region at Chennai, Western Region at Mumbai, Northern Region at Chandigarh and Central Region at Delhi and 20 branch offices. It also works as WTO-TBT enquiry point for India.

Regulatory framework

National Building Code of India, 2005 
It is a comprehensive building code for regulating the building construction activities across the country which was first published in 1970. Preliminary Draft Amendment No. 1 to NBC 2005 Part 11 "Approach to Sustainability" was put into circulation a preliminary draft amendment and BIS accepted the feedback from people till 15 March 2013.

Indian Standards Bill, 2015 
The Bill was passed on 8 March 2016 by the Rajya Sabha. The new Bill will repeal the existing Bureau of Indian Standards Act, 1986. The main objectives of the proposed legislation are:
 To establish the Bureau of Indian standards (BIS) as the National Standards Body of India.
 The Bureau to perform its functions through a governing council, which will consist of President and other members.
 To include goods, services and systems, besides articles and processes under the standardization regime.
 To enable the government to bring under the mandatory certification regime for such articles, processes or service which it considers necessary from the point of view of health, safety, environment, prevention of deceptive practices, consumer security etc. This will help consumers receive ISI certified products and will also help in prevention of import of sub-standard products.
 To allow multiple types of simplified conformity assessment schemes including self-declaration of conformity (SDOC) against any standard which will give multiple simplified options to manufacturers to adhere to standards and get a certificate of conformity, thus improving the 'ease of doing business'.
 To enable the Government to implement mandatory hallmarking of precious metals articles.
 To strengthen penal provisions for better effective compliance and enable compounding of offences for violations.
 To provide recall, including product liability of products bearing the Standard Mark, but not conforming to relevant Indian Standards.
 Repeal of the BIS Act of 1986.
 The Bureau of Indian Standards Act 2016 received the assent of the President on 21 March 2016.

Organisation

National Institute of Training for Standardization (NITS) 
It is a training institute of BIS which is set up in 1995. It is functioning from Noida, Uttar Pradesh, India.

The primary activities of NITS are:
 In-House and Open Training Programme for Industry
 International Training Programme for Developing Countries (Commonwealth countries)
 Training Programme to its employees.

Cells

Laboratories 
To support the activities of product certification, BIS has a chain of 8 laboratories. These laboratories have established testing facilities for products of chemical, food, electrical and mechanical disciplines. Approximately, 25000 samples are being tested in the BIS laboratories every year. In certain cases where it is economically not feasible to develop test facilities in BIS laboratories and also for other reasons like overloading of samples, equipment being out of order, the services of outside approved laboratories are also being availed. Except for the two labs, all the other labs are NABL (National Accreditation Board for Testing and Calibration Laboratories) accredited. It operates a laboratory recognition scheme also.

Small Scale Industry Facilitation Cell 
SSI Facilitation Cell became operational since 26 May 1997. The aim of the Cell is to assist the small scale entrepreneurs who are backbone of the Indian industry. It has an incentive scheme to promote such units to get certified with ISI Mark.

Grievance Cell 
If any customer reports about the degraded quality of any certified product at Grievance Cell, BIS HQs, BIS gives redressal to the customer.

Collaboration with international standards bodies 
BIS is a founder member of International Organization for Standardization (ISO). It represents India in the International Organization for Standardization (ISO), the International Electrotechnical Commission (IEC) and the World Standards Service Network (WSSN).

Activities

Standard formulation and promotion 
One of the major functions of the Bureau is the formulation, recognition and promotion of the Indian Standards. As on 1 January 2019, over 20,000 Standards have been formulated by BIS, are in force. These cover important segments of economy, which help the industry in upgrading the quality of their products and services.

BIS has identified 15 sectors which are important to Indian Industry. For formulation of Indian Standard, it has separate Division Council to oversee and supervise the work. The Standards are regularly reviewed and formulated in line with the technological development to maintain harmony with the International Standards.

Product Certification

For Indian manufacturers 
Product Certifications are to be obtained voluntarily. For, some of the products like Milk powder, Drinking Water, LPG Cylinders, etc., certification is mandatory. Because these products are concerned with health and safety.

For foreign manufacturers 
Foreign manufacturers of products who intend to export to India also may obtain a BIS product certification license. For some products various Indian government ministries/departments/agencies makes its compulsory to have BIS certification. Towards this, BIS launched its Product Certification Scheme for overseas manufacturers in the year 2000, which is called Foreign Manufacturers Certification Scheme. Under the provisions of this scheme, foreign manufacturers can seek certification from BIS for marking their product(s) with BIS Standard Mark. The foreign manufacturer needs to appoint an Authorized Indian Representative who will be an Indian Resident to act as an agent between BIS and the manufacturer.
Depending on the product, the manufacturer has to imprint one of two possible marks on the product label. The Standard Mark or the ISI Mark.
The Standard Mark is compulsory for certain types of electronics and IT goods, whereas the ISI mark is mandatory for product categories such as cement, household electrical products, food products, steel materials, etc. The ISI mark is also used for several voluntary BIS certification product categories.

For Indian importers 
Indian importers who intend to get Certification Mark may apply for the license. However, the assessment visit is paid to the original product manufacturer.

Management System Certification 
 Quality Management System Certification Scheme IS/ISO 9001
 Environmental Management System Certification Scheme IS/ISO 14001
 Occupational Health and Safety Management System Certification Scheme IS 18001
 Hazard Analysis and Critical Control Scheme IS 15000
 Food Safety Management System Certification IS/ISO 22000
 Service Quality Management System Certification Scheme IS 15700
 Energy Management System Certification Scheme IS/ISO 50001
 Medical Devices Management System Certification Scheme IS/ISO 13485
 Social Accountability Management System Certification Scheme IS 16001
 Integrated Management System Certification Scheme
 Road Traffic Safety Management System Certification Scheme IS/ISO Ready Mixed Concrete Certification Scheme
 Integrated Milk Certification Scheme
 Adventure Tourism Safety Management System Certification Scheme IS/ISO 21101
 Food Safety Auditing as per Food Safety and Standards (Food Safety Audit) Regulations, 2018

See also 

 Certification marks in India
 ISI mark
 BIS hallmark
 Agmark
 FPO mark
 Quality Council of India
 Indian Patent Office

References

External links
 
 Indian Standard Codes for Civil Engineering
 IS codes for brickwork
 IS codes for concrete work
 IS codes for soil and Foundation engineering
 IS codes for Measurements
 mirror and remixing of the safety standards done by Public.Resource.Org

Indian Standards, Bureau of
Government agencies of India
1986 establishments in India
Government agencies established in 1986
Ministry of Consumer Affairs, Food and Public Distribution